In mathematics, a Hadamard manifold, named after Jacques Hadamard — more often called a Cartan–Hadamard manifold, after Élie Cartan — is a Riemannian manifold  that is complete and simply connected and has everywhere non-positive sectional curvature. By Cartan–Hadamard theorem all Cartan–Hadamard manifolds are diffeomorphic to the Euclidean space  Furthermore it follows from the Hopf–Rinow theorem that every pairs of points in a Cartan–Hadamard manifold may be connected by a unique geodesic segment. Thus Cartan–Hadamard manifolds are some of the closest relatives of

Examples

The Euclidean space  with its usual metric is a Cartan-Hadamard manifold with constant sectional curvature equal to 

Standard -dimensional hyperbolic space  is a Cartan-Hadamard manifold with constant sectional curvature equal to

Properties 

In Cartan-Hadamard manifolds, the map  is a covering map for all

See also

References

Riemannian manifolds